Porter House, also known as Porter Residence, in Syracuse, New York, is a home designed by Ward Wellington Ward.  It was listed on the National Register of Historic Places in 1997 for its architecture.

References

Houses on the National Register of Historic Places in New York (state)
Houses in Syracuse, New York
American Craftsman architecture in New York (state)
Colonial Revival architecture in New York (state)
Houses completed in 1909
National Register of Historic Places in Syracuse, New York